Shahrak-e Karkhaneh Qand Jowayin (also Romanized as Shahraḵ-e Kārkhāneh Qand Jowayin) is a village in Bala Jowayin Rural District, in the Central District of Jowayin County, Razavi Khorasan Province, Iran. At the 2006 census, its population was 233, in 61 families.

References 

Populated places in Joveyn County